The 1996–97 I-Divisioona season was the 23rd season of the I-Divisioona, the second level of Finnish ice hockey. 16 teams participated in the league, and Karhut won the championship. The top six teams from the final round qualified for the promotion and relegation round of the SM-liiga.

Final round

Qualification round

Relegation 
 Kiekko-67 Turku - Vaasan Sport 1:2 (5:3, 2:7, 1:2 OT)
 Diskos Jyväskylä - Titaanit Kotka 2:1 (5:3, 1:2, 4:1)

External links 
 Season on hockeyarchives.info

I-Divisioona seasons
Fin
2